Daniel Frederik Petersen (21 December 1757 – 24 September 1816) was a Norwegian military officer.

Johan Daniel Frederik Petersen was born at  Drammen in Buskerud, Norway. 

He was a career Military Officer. He first enlisted in the military during 1783 in the service of the Prussian Army. He rose in the rank to Captain in the Norske Jegerkorps at Kongsvinger in Hedmark during 1788 and Major in the 2nd Akershus Infantry Regiment in 1801. In 1807, he became a Lieutenant colonel and in 1811  Colonel and Commanding officer of Sønnafjelske infantry Regiment in Halden at the fortress of Fredriksten. In 1814 he had the rank of Major General and was Second-in-command at Fredriksten fortress.

He represented Sønnafjelske infantry Regiment, together with Ole Svendsen Iglerød, at the Norwegian Constituent Assembly in 1814. He died in Christiania during 1816.

References

1757 births
1816 deaths
People from Drammen
People from Buskerud
Norwegian Army generals
Norwegian military personnel of the Napoleonic Wars
Fathers of the Constitution of Norway